The Mineral, Washington murders, dubbed by the media as "the Tube Sock Killings," is a series of unsolved murders that occurred in remote areas of Lewis and Pierce County, Washington, near the remote community of Mineral, Washington, in 1985. The murder cases were widely publicized, and were featured on the television series Unsolved Mysteries in 1989.

Case

Harkins and Cooper
On August 10, 1985, Steven Harkins, 27, and his girlfriend, Ruth Cooper, 42, left their Tacoma, Washington home for a weekend camping trip at Tule Lake in Pierce County. When the two did not return to their jobs at a Tacoma vocational school the following Monday, their families reported them missing. Four days later, on August 14, hikers passing through Pierce County found Harkins' body near a remote campsite. He had been shot in the head, and his body, still in a sleeping bag, suggested he had been murdered while sleeping. Nearby, searchers also found Harkins' and Cooper's pet dog, who had been shot to death as well. At the time, law enforcement suspected that the case may have been connected to the murders of Edward Smith and Kimberly Diane La Vine, a couple from Kent, Washington who were abducted, murdered, and disposed of in a gravel pit near the Columbia River in March 1985.

Dental records confirmed the skull belonged to Cooper, and two days later on October 28, her body and her purse were also recovered from the area,  from where her skull had been found. A tube sock had been tied around Cooper's neck. According to the autopsy, Cooper had died of "homicidal violence," though a spokesman later stated she had died of a gunshot wound to the abdomen. After the discovery of Cooper, the murders were publicized by Crime Stoppers in an attempt to recover information leading to the arrest of those responsible.

Riemer and Robertson

Over a month after the discovery of Ruth Cooper, on December 12, 1985, Mike Riemer, 36, his girlfriend, Diana Robertson, 21, and their daughter, Crystal Louise Robertson, age 2, traveled from their Tacoma home to Pierce County, planning to find a camp site near the Nisqually River. Riemer, an animal trapper, also planned to check on traps he had set in the area. Crystal was placed in temporary foster care until her maternal grandmother saw her photograph on a local news broadcast two days later. When asked where her mother was, the dazed two-year-old told her grandmother that her "Mommy was in the trees." According to investigators, the two-year-old was "not nearly verbal enough" to provide any information.

Police searched the area both on foot and by air, looking for evidence of Riemer's red 1982 Plymouth pickup truck, but efforts remained fruitless. On February 18, 1986, over two months after the couple's disappearance, the body of Diana Robertson was discovered half-buried in snow by a motorist near a logging road off of Washington State Route 7, just south of Elbe. Bloodhounds scoured the area in the following days, but  of snowfall impeded the search. Riemer's pickup truck was also found near Robertson's body.

In the truck, police discovered a note on the dashboard that read "I love you, Diana." It was written on a manila envelope. Robertson's mother claimed the handwriting was that of Riemer. Bloodstains were also found on the seat of the truck. An autopsy revealed that Diana Robertson had been stabbed seventeen times, and, as with Ruth Cooper, was also found with a tube sock tied around her neck.

Due to Riemer's disappearance, investigators suspected he may have been responsible for Robertson's murder, and had abandoned his daughter at the Kmart store and then subsequently fled. However, they were unable to determine a solid motive for Riemer to kill his girlfriend. Police theorized that Riemer may have been responsible for Harkins' and Cooper's murders as well; an alternate theory, however, claimed that Riemer was also a victim of the same killer who had murdered Robertson, Harkins, and Cooper.

In February 1986, after the discovery of Robertson's body, the Seattle Post-Intelligencer published an article revealing that Riemer had been charged with domestic assault against Robertson on October 19, 1985. However, the couple had reconciled by December, the month in which they disappeared. Riemer, who worked as a roofer at Seattle’s Queen City Sheet Metal and Roofing Inc., was described by his employer as a "typical roofer who worked hard and played hard."

2011 development
On March 26, 2011, hikers discovered a partial human skull later determined to be that of Mike Riemer. It was found in an area within a mile radius of where Robertson's body had been discovered in 1986. After recovery of the skull, Lewis County investigators stated that they believed Riemer could have been a possible victim of homicide as well, though his cause of death could not be determined. Based on the condition of the skull, however, authorities were able to rule out a gunshot wound to the head.

Media depiction
In September 1989, the case was featured by the series Unsolved Mysteries.

See also
List of fugitives from justice who disappeared
List of serial killers in the United States
List of solved missing person cases
List of unsolved murders

References

External links
Audio segment on The Trail Went Cold podcast
Case profile at unsolved.com

1985 in Washington (state)
1985 murders in the United States
1980s missing person cases
American murder victims
August 1985 crimes
August 1985 events in the United States
December 1985 crimes
December 1985 events in the United States
Couples
Crimes in Washington (state)
Deaths by firearm in Washington (state)
Deaths by stabbing in the United States
Formerly missing people
Fugitives
Missing person cases in Washington (state)
Murder in Washington (state)
People murdered in Washington (state)
Serial murders in the United States
Unidentified American serial killers
Unsolved murders in the United States